The Mississippi River & Bonne Terre Railway (M.R. & B.T.) was a single-track standard-gauge steam railroad that was located in southeastern Missouri and began service in 1892. It extended from Riverside in a general southwesterly direction to the lead-mining field in St. Francois County. Sidings and spurs aggregated , and all tracks owned .

Corporate history

Predecessors 

The minerals and supplies of the St. Joseph Lead Co., which operated one of the world-leading lead mines, were transported until 1880 on animal-drawn wagons between the mines and the St. Louis and Iron Mountain Railway. It was inaugurated on 18 January 1880 and became known as the St. Joseph & Des Loge Railway. The narrow-gauge line was apparently jointly owned by the St. Joseph Lead Company and the Desloge Company. It was removed after the M.R. & B.T.'s property was placed in service. The cost was split between both companies: The St. Joe paid 66% and the Desloge Company paid 33%. The St. Joe Lead Company acquired in 1887 the assets of the Desloge Lead Company, and tried to find a shorter route, to reduce the transportation cost.

M.R. & B.T. 

The M.R. & B.T. was incorporated for a term of 50 years on May 11, 1888, under the provisions of Chapter 21, Articles 1 and 2, of the revised statutes of Missouri. The incorporators were nominees of the St. Joseph Lead Company. The avowed purpose of the corporation was to construct, operate, and maintain a standard or broad gauge railroad, extending in a northerly direction from Bonne Terre, St. Francois County, through St. Francois and Jefferson Counties, in Missouri, to a point on the Mississippi River now known as Riverside.

The railway was initially constructed as a narrow gauge railroad between Bonne Terre and Riverside, a wharf at the Mississippi River. The first section was inaugurated in 1890 and the Summit Railroad was subsequently abandoned. In 1894 the gauge of the railroad was re-gauged to standard gauge and later the track was expanded from Bonne Terre to Doe Run. It crossed the Belmont Branch of the Iron Mountain Railway at Doe Run Junction.

It was built similar to most trunk lines. A branch line was laid to Leadwood and there were several miles of feeders, turn-offs and sidings. The railroad ran through the growing towns of Bonne Terre, Desloge, St. Francois, Flat River, Rivermines, Elvins and Doe Run, whose economy benefited from the improved transport capabilities.

The rail weights ranged between 75 and 90 lb/yard (37.5–45 kg/metre) similar to most trunk lines. Even so, the order for two Baldwin 4-6-2 Pacific locomotives included the following caution: "Engine frames to be extra heavy throughout. Engine frames to be designed to withstand rough usage and considerable lateral thrust, which will be continually in evidence given that the road is all curves, there being only one tangent [straight track] which is a mile long."

The following amendments to the original charter have been filed: 
 On May 1, 1891, to change the style of construction of the road from standard to narrow gauge, and on November 4, 1893, to change it back from narrow to standard gauge. 
 On May 1, 1891, to increase the authorized capital stock to $500,000; on June 21, 1895, to $600,000; on September 14, 1903, to $2,500,000; and on August 3, 1911, to $3,000,000, which is the amount of capital stock authorized on June 30, 1914, the date of an ICC valuation.

The M.R.& B.T.'s main line from Riverside to Bonne Terre, was constructed for it by the St. Joseph Lead Company during 1889 and 1890. It was placed in regular service on March 10, 1890. The extension of the main line from Bonne Terre to Doe Run Junction, was also built by the St. Joseph Lead Company for the M.R. & B.T. It was placed in service in June, 1892. The southerly end of the main stem, extending from Doe Run Junction to Doe Run, was built, during 1892, by the Doe Run Lead Company, a subsidiary of the St. Joseph Lead Company. It was operated by the M.R. & B.T. under lease until September, 1893, when it was purchased outright. The foregoing  of line were originally built as narrow gauge, but was changed to standard gauge in 1893–1894.

The four branch lines, embracing , were constructed as standard gauge as follows:
Turpin branch, Doe Run to Turpin, was built by the M.R. & B.T. in 1895-6:  
Hoffman branch, Hoffman Junction to Big River, was built by the M.R. & B.T. in 1899, and extension from Big River to end of track, built by the M.R. & B.T. in 1902:  
Gumbo branch, from River Mines to Mitchell Junction, was built by the St. Joseph Lead Company in 1898 and was purchased by the M.R. & B.T. in 1901; the extension from Mitchell Junction to the end of track, was built by the M.R. & B.T. in 1906  
Crawley branch, from Flat River to milepost , was constructed by the St. Joseph Lead Company in 1893 and was purchased by the M.R. & B.T. in 1901; from milepost 1.03 to Columbia Mill, 0.731 mile was constructed by the Doe Run Lead Company in 1900–1901 and was acquired by the M.R. & B.T. in 1908.

Aftermath 
The Missouri Pacific acquired the M.R. & B.T. in 1929 and merged it with the Missouri-Illinois Railroad, which operated it as an independent subsidiary until 1945. In 1938 a gasoline passenger train operated and made two round trips per day. The Missouri Pacific Railway subsequently acquired 51% of the Missouri–Illinois Railroad, with which it merged in 1978.

The  section from Derby at the junction with the Missouri-Illinois Railway to Doe Run ceased operations in 1941. The  section from Howe to Bonne including the tunnel were disused in 1969. The two  sections up north and south of Bonne Terre were still in use in the late 1980s.

Rolling stock 
 21 steam locomotives
 1172 goods wagons
 15 passenger carriages
 10 pieces of work equipment

See also 
 Desloge family
 Bonne Terre Mine
 St. Joe Lead Company Administration Building

References

External links 
 

Predecessors of the Union Pacific Railroad
Defunct Missouri railroads
Standard gauge railways in the United States
Railway companies established in 1888
Railway companies disestablished in 1945
1929 mergers and acquisitions